is a Japanese singer and voice actress from Kanagawa Prefecture. Kobayashi is currently affiliated with Newcome Inc, and her singles are released under label Toy's Factory. She is best known for her role as Yoshiko Tsushima in the multimedia franchise Love Live! Sunshine!!.

Biography
Kobayashi was born on October 23, 1993 at Kanagawa Prefecture. She is good at dancing. She is 1/4 of Korean descent, with her mother being half Korean and Japanese, while her father is Japanese. Kobayashi learned ballet at the age of 5 and hip hop at third year of elementary school.

In 2011, Kobayashi debuted as a singer for TV anime Freezing ending theme,  and was released as a split single with its opening theme. In 2012, Kobayashi released a single for TV anime Queen's Blade Rebellion ending theme, "Future is Serious". Both singles are released under Media Factory's record labels.

In 2015, Kobayashi debuted as a voice actress with Love Live! Sunshine!! as Yoshiko Tsushima. Kobayashi belonged to the idol group Aqours and its sub unit Guilty Kiss along with Rikako Aida and Aina Suzuki. Kobayashi is nicknamed "Aikyan" by both fans and Aqours members.

In November 2016, Kobayashi was announced to be one of the permanent hosts in Love Live! Sunshine!!'s radio program along with Anju Inami and Arisa Komiya.

In 2019, she released "NO LIFE CODE", her debut single.

Works

Filmography
Main roles are marked in bold.

Anime
Love Live! Sunshine!! as Yoshiko Tsushima
Our love has always been 10 centimeters apart as Student B
Piace: My Italian Cooking as Rii Kagetsu
Farewell, My Dear Cramer as Yū Tenma
Genjitsu no Yohane: Sunshine in the Mirror as Yoshiko Tsushima

Video games
Love Live! School Idol Festival as Yoshiko Tsushima
Uchi no Hime-sama ga Ichiban Kawaii as Bikyaku Hime Leg Bonito
Love Live! School Idol Festival ALL STARS as Yoshiko Tsushima

Radio
Love Live! Sunshine!! Aqours Uranohoshi Jogakuin Radio!!! (2016, Hibiki Radio Station)

Discography

Singles

Studio albums

Participation work

As Aqours

References

External links 

Official website 
Official blog 
Official agency profile 

1993 births
Living people
Anime singers
Aqours members
Japanese people of Korean descent
Japanese actresses of Korean descent
Japanese women pop singers
Japanese video game actresses
Japanese voice actresses
Voice actresses from Kanagawa Prefecture
21st-century Japanese actresses
21st-century Japanese singers
21st-century Japanese women singers